Julianne Courtice (born 3 November 1991 in Gloucester) is an English professional squash player. As of October 2021, she was ranked number 31 in the world.

Career
In 2022, she won a bronze at the 2022 Women's World Team Squash Championships.

References

1991 births
Living people
English female squash players